Eoarthropleura was a genus of millipede-like creatures which lived between the Late Silurian and Late Devonian periods. It reached  in length. Fossils, mainly of cuticle fragments, have been found in Europe (Rhineland-Palatinate, Germany and Shropshire, England) and North America (New York, USA and New Brunswick, Canada). It is the earliest known member of the Arthropleuridea, and the oldest known terrestrial animal of North America.

References 

Silurian myriapods
Devonian myriapods
Late Devonian animals
Pridoli first appearances
Frasnian extinctions
Paleozoic arthropods of North America
Paleozoic arthropods of Europe
Prehistoric myriapod genera
Fossil taxa described in 1976